In the United States, a public defender is a lawyer appointed by the courts and provided by the state or federal governments to represent and advise those who cannot afford to hire a private attorney. Public defenders are full-time attorneys employed by the state or federal governments. The public defender program is one of several types of criminal legal aid in the United States.

Background and history
Prior to the Sixth Amendment of the United States Constitution, legal aid was accessible only to those who had the ability to pay. During that time, people who were not able to pay for an attorney usually did not have access to one. The Sixth Amendment changed this concept that only those who had money had the right to an attorney. The Sixth Amendment reads:In all criminal prosecutions, the accused shall enjoy the right to a speedy and public trial, by an impartial jury of the state and district wherein the crime shall have been committed, which district shall have been previously ascertained by law, and to be informed of the nature and cause of the accusation; to be confronted with the witnesses against him; to have compulsory process for obtaining witnesses in his favor, and to have the assistance of counsel for his defense.One of the listed rights granted and guaranteed by the Sixth Amendment is the right to counsel; the right for defendants, who are on trial for criminal charges, to have legal aid in federal courts. The Sixth Amendment's right to counsel is for criminal cases only; it is not for civil cases or charges that do not carry a risk of imprisonment. Although the Sixth Amendment introduced the right to counsel in the United States, the Supreme Court would further interpret and expand on this right.

Supreme Court rulings

Powell v. Alabama, 287 U.S. 45 (1932) 
In 1931 in Scottsboro, Alabama nine black youths, the "Scottsboro Boys", were placed on trial after two young white women claimed they were raped by the young black men.  The day of their trial, the "Scottsboro Boys" were not appointed counsel by the judge and were instead represented by two unqualified people: a real estate agent from Tennessee and an old attorney who had not practiced law in many years.  Both legal representatives of the "Scottsboro Boys" had very little information and knowledge about the situation but did not attempt to push back the trial.  Every "Scottsboro Boy", except for one, was sentenced to death despite the fact the doctors who checked the two young women did not find any proof of rape.

The case was appealed but reaffirmed by the state supreme court and then appealed again.  The case eventually climbed to and caught the eyes and attention of the Supreme Court of the United States in 1932.  In a vote from 7-2, the Supreme Court overruled the conviction of the "Scottsboro Boys", stating that trial denied the due process and the equal protection clauses granted by the Fourteenth Amendment to the nine men by denying them the right to counsel granted by the Sixth Amendment.

The Supreme Court also ruled that, under the Fourteenth Amendment, the federal and state governments are to give legal counsel for capital crimes, crimes that can result in the death penalty, if the defendant is unable to afford their own private attorneys.  This ruling expanded the interpretation of the Sixth Amendment and applied the rights of the Sixth Amendment to the states, not just the federal government, as well.

Betts v. Brady, 316 U.S. 455 (1942) 
The Betts v. Brady case narrowed the interpretation and the understanding that came about from the Powell v. Alabama case. In 1941, a 43-year old man by the name of Betts was arrested for stealing in the state of Maryland. Betts requested for an attorney, as he lacked the means to do so himself, but his request was denied by the court on the grounds that appointments were only granted to those on trial for capital crimes forcing him to represent himself. Betts was found guilty but attempted to appeal, arguing that the courts refusal to give him an attorney violated rights granted to him in the Fifth and Sixth Amendment such as the right to counsel. He argued that the court's refusal to grant him an attorney was in direct violation to the Supreme Court's decision from Powell v. Alabama.

The Supreme Court, by a 6–3 decision, supported Betts' conviction. Associate Justice Owen Roberts, the writer of the Supreme Court's opinion on this case, stated that the precedent set from Powell v. Alabama of appointing legal counsel was not set in stone due to the fact that there are different scenarios where something can appear to be unfair in one situation but not in another. He argued that in Powell v. Alabama, the legal counsel was necessary because the trial itself was prejudiced. Roberts also stated that the concept of appointing counsel was not required for every case by the states. The Court argued that the right to counsel was not one of the fundamental rights protected by the Constitution and the Bill of Rights.  Ultimately, this ruling would allow the States freedom to decide when to grant the indigent defender legal counsel. The implications of the Supreme Court's decision of this case would last until the Supreme Court case Gideon v. Wainwright in 1963.

Gideon v. Wainwright, 372 U.S. 335 (1963) 
The case Gideon v. Wainwright was a landmark case that would set the precedent on how legal counsel would work in the United States. In 1961, a burglary occurred in a poolroom in Florida and a man named Clarence Earl Gideon was arrested by the police on the basis of an eyewitness's testimony. Gideon requested for legal counsel to the courts as he was unable to afford a lawyer however, at the time, Florida only allowed appointed counsel for capital crimes, not lesser crimes like breaking and entering, and thus his request was denied. Florida's system was brought about by the previous Supreme Court Case Betts v. Brady, which allowed states to decide on their own when to offer indigent defense. Gideon was forced to defend himself; despite his hard work, he ended up being sentenced to prison for five years.

Gideon petitioned the Supreme Court on the grounds that he was not provided counsel and thus was denied him of his rights granted by the Fifth and Sixth Amendments of the United States Constitution and therefore, he was imprisoned on unconstitutional grounds. The Supreme Court unanimously ruled that the denial of Gideon's request for a lawyer was unconstitutional and that the Sixth Amendment grants the defendant the right to an attorney even if the defendant is unable to pay for one. The Courts ruled that states were required to provide lawyers on the grounds that having lawyers to defend defendants were a necessity. Justice Black, the writer of the Court's opinion, stated:

Justice Black's opinion showed a similar argument that that of the Court's from Powell v. Alabama, the guiding hand of counsel can prevent an innocent man from being imprisoned falsely. From this point on, all defendants on trial for criminal charges were guaranteed the right to a lawyer, no matter what their financial situation looks like. The Court's decision in this case overturned the previous understanding of legal counsel set by the Court in Betts v. Brady. Gideon v. Wainwright would be the catalyst for the wave of change in criminal justice that the 1950s and 1960s would experience.

Strickland v. Washington, 466 U.S. 668 (1984) 
The Supreme Court case Strickland v. Washington changed the way people interpret the Sixth Amendment by stating that the legal counsel provided to defendants should be reasonably effective. Strickland was placed on trial for murder charges in the state of Florida and was sentenced to death. Strickland appealed to the Supreme Court justice on the grounds that his counsel did not fulfill his duty on grounds such as not seeking a psychiatric exam despite the fact Strickland pleaded emotional issues. The Supreme Court ruled 8-1 that effective legal counsel is a right but in order to prove the counsel is ineffective, the defendant needs to prove (1) their lawyer's performance was below a certain standard and (2) there is a chance that if it was not for the ineffectiveness, a different result could have occurred.

Inception of the public defender
Although there had been some provisions for legal counsel for the indigent population prior to Gideon, Gideon served as the catalyst for a wave of change. Following the landmark 1963 decision, the 1960s witnessed the creation of programs across the country to make this right to counsel available to most people charged with crimes who could not afford an attorney to represent them.

California's first female attorney, Clara Shortridge Foltz, came up with the idea of the public defender. Foltz was growing concerned with the prosecutors in court, feeling that they served themselves, and believed in the creation of a rival that would mirror the prosecutor, just as qualified but instead of searching for guilt, searching for innocence. Foltz was also inspired by the people she represented in court such as Charles Colby who lamented over spending all that he owned on ineffective legal counsel. She proposed this, at the time, radical idea of the public defender system at the 1893 Chicago World's Fair as well as wrote numerous law articles on the reasoning why the costs of the criminal defendant should be shouldered by the government. One memorable quote from her speech at the Chicago World fair was:

Despite the fact that provisions for indigent legal defense did exist before the creation of the public defender program, Foltz argued the lawyers appointed were unqualified in comparison to the public prosecutors. In fact, she believed that the public defender should be created as a mirror to the public prosecutor; she wished for the selection and the salary to be the same. Her goal of seeing this idea come to fruition saw success when the state of California would see the first public defender office of the United States open in the city of Los Angeles in 1913. Following the creation of the Los Angeles Public Defender office, the public defender program and idea spread throughout the nation.

Alternate indigent defense systems
The public defender system is not the only form of indigent defense program offered in the United States.  Besides the public defender system, there are two other main alternatives: assigned-counsel system and contract-service system.  Assigned-counsel is where the court appoints a private lawyer to defend someone who cannot afford to pay.  Contract-service is where an attorney is contracted to work for a period of time.  These three forms are usually mixed and matched together in different ways in different states.  For instance, most states usually use both assigned-counsel and the public defender program side by side.  Assigned counsel is usually used when the public defender program is overexerted in the number of cases they have to process or if there is a legal issue of conflict of interest in a case.

State systems
In some US states, the office is not titled as "Public Defender"; for example, Kentucky's public defender office is called the Department of Public Advocacy.

Structure
Public defender agencies of all kinds are supported by public funding, but are ethically bound to be independent and do not take direction from the government as to the acceptance or handling of cases, or to the hiring of staff attorneys.  One of the most well established statewide public defender systems is in Wisconsin.   The Wisconsin State Public Defender has been used as a model for other states and several countries.  Wisconsin has a program that uses both staff attorneys and appointments to attorneys in private practice.  State public defender systems can vary widely from state to state, county to county, and from federal defender organizations.  Most chief public defenders are appointed.  The chief public defenders in Florida, Tennessee, Lincoln, Nebraska, and San Francisco are elected.

Defenders vary greatly regarding the types of support staff they employ to support the work of their attorneys.  In addition to clerical staff, defender offices may employ investigators, social workers, and forensic experts, such as psychologists.  These human resources may help defenders provide more professional service than an appointed lawyer without this type of staff or funds to employ them.  Private appointed attorneys are entitled to apply to the court for the services of an expert or investigator and the government is required to pay for those services if they are essential to the defense of the accused person.

Pay
In jurisdictions where indigent defense is handled on the basis of contracts or ad-hoc appointments, there has been increasing concern about the low pay and minimal resources given to public defenders.

In jurisdictions where the public defender is a government agency, public defenders are generally on the same or similar pay-scale to prosecutors. This rate of pay is generally below that of the private sector. In jurisdictions without an organized public defender agency, some courts and legislatures in some states tend to "cap" the amount a panel attorney who does not work for a public defender receives.

Practice
Entry level public defenders can be hired straight out of their third year of law school. State public defenders and state prosecutors typically begin their careers handling criminal cases on the misdemeanor level and work closely with a supervising attorneys on their more complex cases.

Full-time state public defenders typically handle felony and misdemeanor criminal cases.

Many staff attorneys belong to unions. In Florida, staff attorneys have no civil service protections.

In US civil cases (e.g., personal injury or a landlord-tenant dispute), public defenders may be appointed in civil cases that are quasi-criminal in nature (e.g., removal of children from parents and civil commitments for alleged sexually violent predators) or in highly unusual situations where the civil proceedings may be highly connected to criminal proceedings; otherwise indigent litigants are referred to a legal aid office.

In the early 2000s, a new form of practice, pioneered at The Bronx Defenders and known as "holistic defense" (or "holistic advocacy") has emerged. Holistic Defense is characterized by four pillars: 1) Seamless access to legal and nonlegal services that meet client needs; 2) Dynamic, interdisciplinary communication; 3) Advocates with an interdisciplinary skill set; 4) A robust understanding of, and connection to, the community served.

Federal public defenders

Structure
Federal Public Defender offices follow one of two models. The first model, the Federal Public Defender, is a federal agency which operates under the Judicial Branch of the federal government, specifically administered by the Administrative Office of the United States Courts. However, they perform administrative and budgetary duties as only the circuit courts of appeals of the United States are in charge of appointing their respective Federal Defenders, who in turn hire lawyers and support staff and manage the office.  This model is followed separately for each individual judicial district in their circuit. The procedures for appointment, re-appointment and other administrative matters vary from circuit to circuit but the Federal Public Defender is appointed for a four-year term. The second model is that of the community defender. Although similar to a federal public defender, technically it is actually a corporation that receives federal grant money and acts more independently from the federal judiciary. Although both type of defender offices are supported by public funding, they do not take direction from the government as to the operation of the offices.

Federal Public Defender offices are customarily located in larger metropolitan areas, but serve clients throughout their assigned area.

Practice
The Office of the Federal Public Defender operates under authority of the Criminal Justice Act of 1964 (CJA),18 U.S.C. § 3006A. It provides defense services in federal criminal cases to individuals who are financially unable to obtain adequate representation. A person's eligibility for defender services is determined by the federal court. Defender organization attorneys may not engage in the private practice of law. Those accused who are found to be indigent in jurisdictions without a Federal or Community Defender, and those for whom there is a conflict or those charged at a time the Defender in their jurisdiction is short staffed or has a full caseload, will be appointed private counsel who are paid an hourly rate from an approved list of qualified lawyers who have the requisite experience to handle a federal criminal case.

A federal defender's case load is usually substantially lower than her or his state counterpart's. While a state public defender may have to juggle over one hundred cases, an Assistant Federal Public Defender routinely has 30-50 cases, though the severity and complexity of such cases may be greater. The federal system has over 4,000 separate offenses, and uses a very mechanistic, sentencing scheme based on a set of "advisory" sentencing guidelines.

Pay
By law, lawyers employed by Federal Public Defender offices have salaries set to match those of lawyers in the U.S. Attorney's office. The combination of salary, benefits and support team tends to attract, and more importantly retain, highly qualified attorneys. Especially in more rural areas, where federal criminal work is considered well-paid, many federal defenders have risen up through the state systems before becoming federal defenders.

Legal issues

Conflict of interest
Because conflict of interest problems could exist where multiple defendants participated in a single crime, only one person in a group of co-defendants will be assigned an attorney from a public defender office. For many defendants, it is in their best interest to testify against co-defendants in exchange for a reduced sentence. To ensure that each defendant is afforded his constitutional right to an effective defense, jurisdictions may have several public defender entities, or a "conflict panel" of private practice attorneys. This enables the court to assign each defendant an attorney from a completely separate office, thereby guarding against the risk of one client's privileged information accidentally falling into the hands of another client's attorney. Some jurisdictions, like in Los Angeles County, employ a separate entity for legal representation called the Alternate Public Defender's office. Any further conflicts are handled by court-appointed private attorneys.

Appeals
Notably, the landmark Gideon case only gives an indigent criminal defendant a right to be represented at trial and upon the first appeal of right.  But the Supreme Court has held that there is no right to representation for discretionary appeals or post-conviction collateral attacks like habeas corpus and coram nobis.  In other words, an indigent convicted criminal who loses his trial, and first appeal of right, is on his own afterwards. (At least one state, Virginia, did not even allow an appeal of right until a change of law took effect in 2022.)

Upon review of the trial court record, an appellate public defender may conclude there are no reasonable or valid grounds for an appeal.  Such a conclusion creates a conflict between the duty to diligently represent the client (and honor their right to a first appeal), and the duty to the court to refrain from filing frivolous appeals. In 2000, the U.S. Supreme Court upheld as constitutional the so-called Wende appellate procedure implemented by California to resolve this dilemma. The appellate public defender files an opening brief summarizing the procedural and factual history of the case, indicates that he has explained his evaluation of the case to his client and told the client of his right to file a pro se supplemental brief, asks that the court independently examine the record for arguable issues, and expresses his availability to argue any issues on which the court desires briefing.  However, the appellate brief never expressly indicates that the appeal is frivolous, though the implicit message is obvious. The California Court of Appeal then undertakes its own review of the record.  If it finds a possible issue, it directs the parties to brief and argue it. If it finds none, it issues an opinion (usually unpublished) affirming the conviction.

Controversy and ethical issues 
The public defender office and position is not without controversy. The public defender position as well as the rights to counsel is reliant on the decisions of the Supreme Court. As Betts v. Brady and Gideon v. Wainwright demonstrated, when Supreme Court overturned their decision of the states having the ability to choose situations when to grant or not to grant legal counsel, the decisions of the Supreme Court can overturn previous notions of the Sixth Amendment. Controversy also arises from people questioning the essential nature of the public defender role and office as there are those who question why the government should fund and support the legal defense of those who they are putting on trial to begin with. In fact, this controversy dates back to 1897: The New-York Tribune found it "a ridiculous thing for the State to prosecute with one hand and defend with the other the violation of its own statutes".

The number of public defenders, their salary and other issues related to public defenders have been controversial. Eric Holder, the United States Attorney General in 2013, phrased the current issues of the public defender system as a state of crisis and saw the current system as a failure to uphold the Sixth Amendment as well as Gideon. The public defenders, especially the State appointed ones, have to deal with numerous issues with respect to excessive caseloads and low salaries. In particular, low salaries can discourage or fail to attract the best legal talent and can also lead to problems retaining experienced attorneys. A good example of such an issue is when Louisiana public defenders were so underfunded, had such a large shortage, and had a huge excessive workload that the office was forced to put defendants in need of a public defender on a waiting list.  One example of public awareness of these issues is the film Lethal Weapon 4, which features a humorous version of the Miranda warning in which the humor comes at public defenders' expense.

Excessive workload appears to be an issue as well. According to a study by the Bureau of Justice Statistics, 73% of the county offices in the United States went over the recommended maximum limit of cases. In Missouri, a study reported that the state required 270 more public defenders just to represent the indigent at a barely acceptable manner.

"Dump truck" and "public pretender" are terms sometimes used by defendants when complaining about their public defender.  The California Court of Appeal for the Fourth Appellate District, Division Two has explained:

Another issue that arises from the lower numbers of public defenders is that the government is forced to rely on alternatives to the public defender system such as private lawyers appointed by the courts. In federal courts, 75 percent of the defendants rely on appointed lawyers especially when the public defender offices have issues with conflict of interest which can be caused by public defender shortages. From studies such as the Rand study, the court appointed private lawyers usually result in higher prison rates as well as higher prison time compared to that of the public defenders. For instance, studies showed that court appointed lawyers had clients with imprisonment times eight months longer, on average, to the clients who had public defenders. The controversy arises from results of Supreme Court Cases such as Strickland v. Washington as some question if the legal counsel provided is effective as the Supreme Court argued effective counsel was guaranteed by the Sixth Amendment. The question also arises, in this scenario, if this is even ethical. Ethical issues in these terms have become so problematic that the United States Department of Justice was forced to research on constitutional violations in representation.

Controversy also exists over the idea of representing the guilty. Mayer Goldman, back in the heydays of the public defender program, questioned what should happen if the public defender represents a guilty defendant. In fact, Harvard Law School's Guide for Careers in Indigent Defense, emphasizes the importance of having to get over the emotion and frustration of having to defend the guilty. Issues over the feeling of defending the guilty is something that people view differently.

Disagreement in the federal appellate courts has arisen over the issue of whether a defendant's sentence may be increased because they lied in order to become eligible for a court-appointed attorney.

See also
 Assistance of Counsel Clause
 Legal aid in the United States
 Public Defender Service for the District of Columbia
 Right to counsel
 Sixth Amendment to the United States Constitution

Explanatory notes

References

Further reading
 Amanda Agan, Matthew Freedman and Emily Owens. 2019. "Is Your Lawyer a Lemon? Incentives and Selection in the Public Provision of Criminal Defense". Review of Economics and Statistics

Criminal justice articles needing expert attention
Legal aid in the United States
Public defenders
United States